Get Evens is the second album by indie/punk duo The Evens. It was released on November 6, 2006.

Track listing
 "Cut from the Cloth"
 "Everybody Knows"
 "Cache Is Empty"
 "You Fell Down"
 "Pushed Against the Wall"
 "No Money"
 "All You Find You Keep"
 "Eventually"
 "Get Even"
 "Dinner with the President"

Personnel
 Ian MacKaye – guitar, vocals
 Amy Farina – drums, vocals

References

2006 albums
The Evens albums
Dischord Records albums